Allen R. Sturtevant (August 27, 1879 – September 15, 1966) was a Vermont attorney and judge.  His most notable work was as an associate justice of the Vermont Supreme Court from 1938 to 1948.

Early life
Allen Robert Sturtevant was born in Granville, New York on August 27, 1879, the son of Royal W. and Susan V. (Oakes) Sturtevant.  He was raised and educated in Granville and New Haven, Vermont, and was an 1897 graduate of Beeman Academy in New Haven.  He received his Ph.B. from the University of Vermont in 1901.  Sturtevant worked as a school teacher in locations including Manlius, New York and Lima, Indiana, and moved to Middlebury, Vermont in 1908.

Career as an attorney
He studied law in Middlebury with Judge Charles I. Button and attorney Ira H. LaFleur, and worked as deputy clerk of the Addison County Court.  In 1911, he received his LL.B. degree from Lincoln-Jefferson College of Law in Hammond, Indiana. Sturtevant was admitted to the bar later that year and began a practice in Middlebury.  Sturtevant entered politics as a Republican, and served as Addison County State's Attorney from 1915 to 1921.  From 1912 to 1929, Sturtevant was Middlebury's village attorney.  He also became involved in banking, and was vice president of the Addison County Trust Company from 1926 to 1929.  During the governorship of John E. Weeks, Sturtevant served as his executive clerk from 1927 to 1929.

Judicial career
In 1929, Governor Weeks appointed Sturtevant a judge of the Vermont Superior Court.  He served until 1938, and advanced through seniority to become the chief judge.

Sturtevant had been chief judge of the Superior Court for only a few months when Leighton P. Slack died.  In April 1938, Sturtevant was appointed as an associate justice of the Vermont Supreme Court, filling the vacancy caused by Slack's death.  He served until retiring on October 1, 1948, and was succeeded by Walter H. Cleary.

Awards
In 1940, Sturtevant received the honorary degree of LL.D. from Middlebury College.

Retirement and death
In retirement, Sturtevant was a resident of Fort Pierce, Florida.  He died there on September 15, 1966, and was buried at Riverview Memorial Park in Fort Pierce.

Family
On June 8, 1904 Sturtevant married Anna Bonner in New York City.  They were the parents of three daughters: Viola, Margaret, and Anna.

References

Sources

Books

Magazines

Newspapers

Internet

External links

1879 births
1966 deaths
People from Granville, New York
People from Middlebury, Vermont
People from Fort Pierce, Florida
University of Vermont alumni
Vermont lawyers
Vermont Republicans
State's attorneys in Vermont
Justices of the Vermont Supreme Court
Burials in Florida